Lelle may refer to:

Lelle, settlement in Estonia
FC Lelle, amateur football club in Lelle, Estonia.
Erhard Lelle (born 1946), German politician
Frank Lelle (born 1965), German football player
Tobias Lelle (born 1955), German voice actor